Albert Arnheiter (20 July 1890 – 26 April 1945) was a German rower who competed in the 1912 Summer Olympics. He was the bowman of the German boat which won the gold medal in the coxed fours. He was killed towards the end of World War II in Italy.

References

External links
 
 
 

1890 births
1945 deaths
Rowers at the 1912 Summer Olympics
Olympic rowers of Germany
Olympic gold medalists for Germany
Olympic medalists in rowing
German male rowers
Medalists at the 1912 Summer Olympics
German military personnel killed in World War II
Sportspeople from Ludwigshafen